Wako is a 2015 Ugandan thriller film directed by Zziwa Aaron Alone and co-produced by director himself with Natuhwera Brighton and Wamasebu Eric for Zaron Motion Pictures, Brina Motion Pictures and Punchside Filmz respectively. It is the sequel to its first feature film Hadithi za Kumekucha:TUNU. The film stars Geoffrey Echakara in titular lead role along with Natuhwera Brighton, Robert Ernest Bbumba and Zziwa Aaron Alone in supportive roles.

The film was filmed from mid 2014 to mid 2015 in the slums and urban slums of Kampala.   The film deals with story of a 23-year-old male thug called Wako who is released from prison and tying to start a new life, but he got to know that his sister is suffering from a cancer.

The trailer of the film went viral through social media. The film was premiered on 1 October 2016 at Theatre La’bonita. The film received critical acclaim and won several awards at international film festivals. In 2015, the film won the award for the Best Feature Film in the Arusha International Film Festival in Tanzania.

Cast
 Geoffrey Echakara as Wako
 Natuhwera Brighton as Sera
 Aaron Zziwa as Kujjo
 Robert Ernest Bbumba as Muggy
 Diana Nabatanzi

References

External links
 Wako on YouTube

2015 films
English-language Ugandan films
2015 thriller drama films
2010s English-language films